University of Botswana Stadium is a multi-use stadium in Gaborone, Botswana, owned by the University of Botswana.  It is used mostly for football matches and serves as the home stadium of Uniao Flamengo Santos F.C.  The stadium holds 8,500 people. It is located across the road from the Botswana Cricket Association Ovals.

References

External links
1. Sports and Recreation, University of Botswana

Football venues in Botswana
Athletics (track and field) venues in Botswana
Sports venues in Gaborone